All the Queen's Men is a 2001 English-language action comedy war film directed by Stefan Ruzowitzky and starring Matt LeBlanc and Eddie Izzard. Made on a budget of $15 million, the film received heavily negative reviews from critics, and it earned only $23,662 in the United States.

Plot
During World War II the British army is attempting to retrieve an Enigma machine from Germany. Having failed in previous attempts, they decide to send four men undercover to the factory that makes the devices in Berlin. Unfortunately the factory is populated entirely by women, and they only have men to send. American O'Rourke (LeBlanc), British transvestite Tony Parker (Izzard), genius Johnno (David Birkin), and the reluctant Archie (James Cosmo) are sent to infiltrate the factory dressed as women.

Dropped in the wrong area, the team must first try to find their bearings. Aided by Romy, a sympathiser to their cause, they find their way to the factory. They manage to retrieve the Enigma machine, against the expectations of the British army. Just before they leave Germany, they realize they were tricked—the British government already had the device, but wanted to make the Germans think they were still after it. They were specifically chosen as the team most likely to fail. Leaving Germany with an Enigma machine would, in fact, destroy the usefulness of the machine, as the Germans would know it was stolen and switch to a different code system. Archie volunteers to be captured with the machine to allow the mission to "fail". After he is captured, the team retrieves him and returns safely to England, leaving the Germans with the impression they have all the Enigma machines and the British are still desperate to obtain one.

Cast
 Matt LeBlanc as Captain Steven O'Rourke
 Eddie Izzard as Lieutenant Tony Parker
 James Cosmo as Major Archie Hartley
 Nicolette Krebitz as Romy
 David Birkin as Johnno
 Edward Fox as Aitken
 Karl Markovics as Hauptsturmführer

Reception 
The film was panned by critics, getting an approval rating of 7% on review aggregation website Rotten Tomatoes and an average rating of 3.50/10, based on 29 reviews. The website's critical consensus reads, "All the Queen's Men never capitalizes on its gender-bending conceit, instead relying on low-hanging jokes that never elicit a chuckle." Roger Ebert mentioned the film in his book Your Movie Sucks, terming it "a perfectly good idea for a comedy, but it just plain doesn't work." Ebert also mentions the problem with the plot being about retrieving an Enigma machine when "Anyone who has seen Enigma, U-571, or the various TV documentaries...will be aware that by the time of the movie, the British already had possession of an Enigma machine... The movie has an answer to it, but it comes so late in the film that although it makes sense technically, the damage has already been done."

See also
 Cross-dressing in film and television

References

External links
 
 
 
 

2001 films
2000s war comedy films
German war comedy films
English-language Austrian films
English-language German films
Films directed by Stefan Ruzowitzky
Films scored by Robert Folk
2000s spy comedy films
World War II spy films
Films about Nazi Germany
Cross-dressing in film
2001 comedy films
2000s English-language films
Austrian war comedy films
2000s German films